Michel Raymond Joseph Belhumeur (born September 2, 1949) is a Canadian former professional ice hockey goaltender who played for the Philadelphia Flyers and Washington Capitals in the National Hockey League.

Playing career
Drafted by the Flyers in 1969, Belhumeur spent most of his time in the minors, but managed to win nine games for Philadelphia before they exposed him to the 1974 NHL Expansion Draft, where he was claimed by the Capitals. Belhumeur played two seasons with the Capitals, and did not win a single game (zero wins, 29 losses, and 4 ties). He played three more years in the minors before retiring in 1979. Belhumeur has the distinction of most games played in one season (35 games in the 1974–75 NHL season with the Capitals) without a win. In 35 games, he won zero games, lost 24, and tied 3.

External links
 
Michel Belhumeur's profile at Hockey Draft Central

1949 births
Canadian ice hockey goaltenders
Charlotte Checkers (EHL) players
Drummondville Rangers players
Living people
Philadelphia Flyers draft picks
Philadelphia Flyers players
Quebec Aces (AHL) players
Richmond Robins players
Sorel Éperviers players
Tulsa Oilers (1964–1984) players
Washington Capitals players
Canadian expatriate ice hockey players in the United States